{{DISPLAYTITLE:CH6N2O3}}
The molecular formula CH6N2O3 (molar mass: 94.07 g/mol, exact mass: 94.0378 u) may refer to:

 Hydrogen peroxide - urea
 Methylammonium nitrate